Stuart Little may refer to:

Stuart Little, the book
Stuart Little (franchise), the animated media franchise based on the book
Stuart Little (film), the first film
Stuart Little 2, the sequel film
Stuart Little 3: Call of the Wild, the second animated sequel film
Stuart Little (TV series), the animated television series